A fontanelle is a soft spot on an infant human skull.

Fontanelle may also refer to:

Places
Italy
Fontanelle, Campello sul Clitunno
Fontanelle, Montichiari
Fontanelle, Veneto
Fontanelle cemetery, Naples

United States
Fontanelle, Iowa
Fontanelle, Nebraska
Fontanel Mansion, a log home in Nashville, Tennessee

Other uses
Fontanelle (album), a 1992 album by Babes in Toyland
Fontanelle, a 2002 novel by Meir Shalev
Nasone or fontanella (plural fontanelle), a type of drinking fountain found in Rome, Italy

See also
 Fontanella (disambiguation)
 Fontenelle (disambiguation)